EAHS may refer to:
 Elgin Area Historical Society, Elgin, Illinois, United States

Schools 
 East Anchorage High School, Anchorage, Alaska, United States
 East Ascension High School, Gonzales, Louisiana, United States
 East Aurora High School, Aurora, Illinois, United States
 East Aurora High School (New York), East Aurora, New York, United States
 Eastern Alamance High School, Mebane, North Carolina, United States
 Easton Area High School, Easton, Pennsylvania, United States
 Elsie Allen High School, Santa Rosa, California, United States
 Esteban Abada High School, Manila, Philippines